DCML may refer to:
Dorsal column-medial lemniscus pathway
Data Center Markup Language
 INDUCKS - Disney comics mailing list